Ed Learn (born September 30, 1937) was a football player in the Canadian Football League for twelve years. He starred as a defensive back for the Montreal Alouettes, where he played from 1959 to 1966 before finishing his career during the last three years as a member of the Toronto Argonauts. He had 34 interceptions with Montreal, his top total being 6 during both 1959 and 1966 seasons. In Toronto, he closed his career with 7 interceptions in 1968 and 8 in 1969. For his efforts, he was named CFL east all-star in 1964, 1966, 1968, and 1969. In addition, he was often used as a punt returner, returning 496 punts for a lifetime average of 6.0 yards per return.

After his CFL career, he became owner of a car dealership in St Catharines, Ontario. 

1937 births
Canadian football defensive backs
Living people
Montreal Alouettes players
Toronto Argonauts players
People from Welland
Players of Canadian football from Ontario